Pointing Up was Preston Reed's first release on Flying Fish Records. It subsequently went out-of-print and was re-released as a compilation with Playing by Ear and re-titled Preston Reed.

Track listing
(All songs by Preston Reed)
 "Whirewhip"
 "Groundhog"
 "Cane Bay"
 "Gone But Not Forgotten"
 "Gittel and Jerry's Theme"
 "A Day at the Races"
 "Fun with Wally"
 "Suite Hoodeet"
 "View from Afar"
 "Potato Pancake"

Personnel
Preston Reed - 6 & 12-string acoustic guitars

Production notes
Engineered by Jonathan Freed
Mastered by Craig Thorson

References

1982 albums
Preston Reed albums